Indiana Militia may refer to:

 Indiana National Guard, which is Indiana's organized-militia component of the US Army National Guard and Air National Guard
 Indiana Guard Reserve, which is the official organized militia of the State of Indiana, also known as the State Defense Force
 Indiana Naval Militia, which is Indiana's currently inactive naval militia
Indiana Legion, a historic militia operating during the mid and late 19th century
Indiana Rangers, an organized militia operating during the early 19th century

See also
 Militia (United States), organized and unorganized